Cameron Anne Young Anastasia Esposito (born October 17, 1981) is an American actor, comedian, and podcaster known for her show Take My Wife, as well as her stand-up comedy and her podcast, Queery. Esposito substantially focuses on topics surrounding the LGBTQ+ community, feminism, social justice, and the challenges faced by members of marginalized communities. Originally from Western Springs, Illinois, Esposito lives in Los Angeles.

Early life
Born to Italian-American parents Brenda and Nick, Cameron Esposito was raised in Western Springs, Illinois. She is the middle of three daughters, having an older sister and a younger sister. In high school, Esposito swam breaststroke on the swim team, was a member of a community service group called The Marians Society, and was a semifinalist for the National Merit Scholarship Program. She graduated from Benet Academy in 2000.

Esposito studied theology and English at Boston College, intending to become a social worker in Chicago. While in Boston, she played rugby and performed in the school's improv troupe, My Mother's Fleabag. Esposito graduated from Boston College in 2004.

After returning to Illinois, Esposito took a semester of social work courses at the University of Chicago before deciding to pursue a different career.

Career

Early stand-up career
Esposito began her stand-up career in Chicago, performing in various local venues, including as a regular at The Lincoln Lodge from 2007 to 2011. She appeared at comedy festivals including SXSW, the Moontower, Bridgetown Comedy Festival, and SF Sketchfest. To supplement her income, she worked with students in special education, as a law clerk at her father's law firm, and as a nanny.

2013–present
In 2013, Esposito made her television debut on The Late, Late Show with Craig Ferguson. Fellow guest Jay Leno expressed admiration for Esposito, calling her "the future of comedy". She has appeared on Conan and on Last Call with Carson Daly. She voiced "Carroll the Cloud Person" on an episode of Cartoon Network's animated show Adventure Time. Entertainment website Consequence of Sound named Esposito its comedian of the year for 2014.

In the fall of 2014, Esposito created a series of videos with BuzzFeed Motion Pictures titled "Ask a Lesbian", in which she answers a variety of questions sent into BuzzFeed staff about lesbianism. The videos also featured then-partner River Butcher. In addition to touring regularly, Esposito was a regular panelist on Chelsea Lately with Chelsea Handler and used to write a regular blog on The A.V. Club.

Esposito's comedy album Same Sex Symbol was released in December 2014 by Kill Rock Stars. She appeared on Comedy Central's Drunk History as a storyteller on October 20, 2015. Esposito co-hosted the stand-up comedy podcast "Put Your Hands Together" with River Butcher, which was recorded weekly in front of a live audience at the Upright Citizens Brigade Theater in Los Angeles from 2013 until July 2019.

Esposito is known for her lesbian content creation, especially hers and Butcher's television show Take My Wife, which streamed on Seeso until the service was discontinued in November 2017. In March 2018, Take My Wife was picked up by iTunes. The show was acquired by Starz in April 2018.

Esposito's podcast Queery is an interview-style podcast focusing on contemporary queer luminaries and their life experiences. Queery guests have included River Butcher, Lena Waithe, Tegan Quin, Sara Quin, Evan Rachel Wood, Jill Soloway, Mary Lambert, Andrea Gibson, Margaret Cho, Alia Shawkat, Roxane Gay, Trixie Mattel, and Lea DeLaria.

On June 11, 2018, Esposito released Rape Jokes, an hour-long standup special about sexual assault from her perspective. The special was free to stream on Esposito's website, but viewers could pay to download a copy and proceeds would benefit RAINN, the United States' largest anti-sexual violence organization. By September 2018, the special had raised $65,000 in donations.

On March 24, 2020, Esposito released her memoir Save Yourself.

Personal life
Esposito is openly lesbian and was married to fellow stand-up comedian River Butcher from 2015 to 2018. Butcher and Esposito collaborated on multiple projects, including the Put Your Hands Together stand-up show, the podcast Wham! Bam! Pow!, and the TV show Take My Wife.

On April 29, 2021, Esposito came out on Twitter and Instagram as genderfluid, stating that she uses both she and they pronouns.

On June 8, 2021, Esposito announced via Twitter that she had married editor Katy Nishimoto.

Filmography

Film

Television

Albums

Podcasts

Online

Books

Notes

References

External links

American lesbian actresses
American people of Italian descent
American podcasters
American stand-up comedians
American television actresses
American women comedians
American women podcasters
Morrissey College of Arts & Sciences alumni
Feminist comedians
Lesbian comedians
LGBT people from Illinois
Living people
Non-binary comedians
People of Campanian descent
1981 births
21st-century American actresses
21st-century American comedians
21st-century American LGBT people
American non-binary actors
Genderfluid people
American LGBT comedians